The Alabama Cooperative Extension System (Alabama Extension) provides educational outreach to the citizens of Alabama on behalf of the state's two land grant universities: Alabama A&M University (state's 1890 land-grant institution) and Auburn University (1872 land-grant institution).

The system employs more than 800 faculty, professional educators, and staff members operating in offices in each of Alabama's 67 counties and in nine urban centers covering the major regions of the state. In conjunction with the Alabama Agricultural Experiment Station, the system also staffs six extension and research centers located in the state's principal geographic regions.

Since 2004, "Alabama Extension" has functioned primarily as a regionally based system in which the bulk of educational programming is delivered by agents operating across a multi-county area and specializing in specific fields. County extension coordinators and county agents (where they are funded), continue to play integral roles in the extension mission, working with regional agents and other extension personnel to deliver services to clients within their areas.

Administrative structure

In 1995, the Alabama Cooperative Extension System became the nation's first unified Extension program, combining the resources of the 1862 and 1890 land-grant institutions.  The catalyst was a landmark federal court ruling, known as Knight vs. Alabama, handed down by Judge Harold Murphy.  Under its terms, the Extension programs and other land-grant university functions of Alabama A&M, Auburn, and Tuskegee (historically African-American institution) universities were combined and served as cooperative partners within this unified system.
This combined effort is headed by a director appointed by the presidents of Alabama A&M and Auburn universities.  The Extension director serves as the organization's chief executive officer and maintains offices at both campuses.

In written remarks outlining his rationale for the ruling, Judge Murphy called for an expanded and updated Cooperative Extension mission that not only continued to address traditional programming needs but that also was better equipped to respond to the needs of a population that had become more urbanized and racially and ethnically diverse. Additionally to providing for an associate director for Rural and Traditional Programs, who would be housed at Auburn University. Judge Murphy also mandated that an associate director of Urban and New Nontraditional Programs be employed and housed at Alabama A&M University.  This new associate director, Murphy stated, would be “expected to open new areas of Extension work and expand the outreach of the Alabama Cooperative Program to more fully serve all the people of Alabama.”

Directors of the Alabama Cooperative Extension System 

 J. F. Duggar,  1914-1920
 Luther N. Duncan, 1920-1937
 P. O. Davis, 1937-1959
 E. T. York, 1959-1961
 Fred R. Robertson, 1961-1971
 Ralph R. Jones, 1971-1974
 W. H. Taylor (Acting), 1974-1975
 J. Michael Sprott, 1975-1983
 Ray Cavender (Acting), 1983-1984
 Ann E. Thompson, 1984-1994
 W. Gaines Smith (Interim), 1994-1997
 Stephen B. Jones, 1997-2001
 W. Gaines Smith, 2001-2011
 Gary Lemme, 2011–2021
 Mike Phillips, 2021-present

2004 reorganization 
In 2004, the Alabama Cooperative Extension System completed a restructuring effort.

For decades, the bulk of Alabama Cooperative Extension programs were carried out by county agents – generalists who kept abreast of many different subjects and delivered a wide variety of programs.  By the onset of the 21st century, urbanization was a key trend that resulted in fewer farms and altered public expectations. The advent of the World Wide Web changed information delivery methods from printed materials to online. These changes prompted the switch from using the generalist agents who had administered Extension programming throughout the previous century to regional agents specializing in one of 14 program priority areas.

Regional agents 
Regional Extension agents work with other agents across regional and disciplinary lines, with area and state subject-matter specialists, and with sister agencies, such as the Alabama Farmers Federation, the Alabama Forestry Commission and the Natural Resources Conservation Service, to deliver programs over a regional and statewide basis.

Continuing county presence

Despite the growing emphasis on regional agents, Alabama Extension continues to operate offices in all 67 counties. These are headed by coordinators, who work with regional agents and other Extension staff to deliver programs within their counties.

Funding
One of the distinguishing traits associated with Cooperative Extension work throughout the country is the financial support it receives from every level of government.  Like many of its sister programs throughout the country, Alabama Extension has begun looking for ways to supplement these traditional sources of funding with private support, typically in the form of grants and fees.

History

A common perception is that the birth of Cooperative Extension followed passage of the Smith-Lever Act of 1914, which provided federal funds to land-grant universities to support Extension work. In a formal sense, this is true. But the roots of Cooperative Extension extend as far back as the late 18th century, following the American Revolution, when affluent farmers first began organizing groups to sponsor educational meetings to disseminate useful farming information. In some cases, these lectures even were delivered by university professors – a practice that foreshadowed Cooperative Extension work more than a century later.

These efforts became more formalized over time. By the 1850s, for example, many schools and colleges began holding farmer institutes – public meetings where lecturers discussed new farming insights.

See also 
Cooperative Extension Service
Luther Duncan
P.O. Davis
List of land-grant universities
National Association of State Universities and Land-Grant Colleges
State university system
Agricultural extension
Historical Panorama of Alabama Agriculture

Notes

External links
Alabama Cooperative Extension System
Alabama A&M University
Auburn University
Tuskegee University
Alabama Cooperative Extension System Historical Photographs
U.S. Department of Agriculture
Cooperative State, Research, Education and Extension Service

 
Public education in Alabama
History of Alabama
Auburn University
Tuskegee University
Government agencies established in 1914
State agencies of Alabama
1914 establishments in Alabama
Alabama A&M University
Agricultural research institutes in the United States
Research institutes in Alabama